Akpes may be,

Akpes language
Gina Akpe-Moses